The rufous-crowned prinia (Prinia khasiana) is a species of bird in the family Cisticolidae.
It is found in northeast India and western Myanmar.

References

Prinia
Birds of Northeast India
Birds described in 1876